José Isabel Blandón Figueroa (born 7 July 1967 in Chitré) is a Panamanian politician, and a member of the National Assembly for the Panameñista Party (previously named Arnulfista Party) since 1999. From 2011 to 2014 he was in opposition to the government of Ricardo Martinelli, and in 2013 was chosen as the Panameñista Party candidate for Mayor of Panama City, winning the party primary election with 97% of the vote. The son of José Isabel Blandón Castillo, his disapproval of his father's position as a top aide to Manuel Noriega helped push his father to defecting in the late 1980s.

References

1967 births
Living people
Panamanian politicians
Members of the National Assembly (Panama)
Panameñista Party politicians
People from Chitré
20th-century Panamanian lawyers